"Me Entrego a Ti" is a Latin pop song recorded by American duo Ha*Ash.  It was first included on Ha*Ash's second studio album "Mundos Opuestos" (2005) where it was released as the second single on November 27, 2005 and then included on their live albums deluxe Primera Fila: Hecho Realidad (2016) and Ha*Ash: En Vivo (2019). Colombian-American singer Soraya wrote the track.

Background and release 
"Me Entrego a Ti" was written by Soraya and produced by Áureo Baqueiro. Is a song recorded by American duo Ha*Ash from her second studio album "Mundos Opuestos" (2005) and then recorded live for his live album deluxe Primera Fila: Hecho Realidad in 2016. It was released as the second single from the album on November 27, 2005, by Sony Music Entertainment.

Commercial performance 
The track peaked at number 15 in the Latin Pop Songs charts in the United States. In Mexico, the song peaked at number 4 in the Monitor Latino.

Music video 
A music video for "Me Entrego a Ti" was released in November, 2005. Was published on her YouTube channel on October 25, 2009. It was directed by David Ruiz. , the video has over 44 million views on YouTube.

The second music video for "Me Entrego a Ti", recorded live for the live album Primera Fila: Hecho Realidad, was released on May 18, 2015. It was directed by Nahuel Lerena. The video was filmed in Lake Charles, Louisiana. , the video has over 16 million views on YouTube.

The third video for "Me Entrego a Ti", recorded live for the live album Ha*Ash: En Vivo, was released on December 6, 2019. The video was filmed in Auditorio Nacional, Mexico City.

Credits and personnel 
Credits adapted from AllMusic and Genius.

Recording and management

 Recording Country: United States
 Sony / ATV Discos Music Publishing LLC / Westwood Publishing
 (P) 2005 Sony Music Entertainment México, S.A. De C.V.

Ha*Ash
 Ashley Grace  – vocals, guitar
 Hanna Nicole  – vocals, guitar 
Additional personnel
 Áureo Baqueiro  – recording engineer, arranger, director 
 Soraya  – songwriting.
 Gerardo García  – guitar, acoustic guitar, mandoline.
 Tommy Morgan  – harmonica.
 Gabe Witcher  – violin.

Charts

Release history

References 

Ha*Ash songs
2005 songs
2005 singles
Songs written by Soraya (musician)
Song recordings produced by Áureo Baqueiro
Spanish-language songs
Pop ballads
Sony Music Latin singles
2000s ballads